Center Township is a township in Pocahontas County, Iowa, USA.

History
Center Township was established in 1874.

References

Townships in Pocahontas County, Iowa
Townships in Iowa